Sejr is a Nordic name, most prevalent in Denmark. It derives from a Danish word meaning victory, triumph.

Notable people with this name include:

Surname
 Arne Sejr (1922–1998), Danish activist
 Emanuel Sejr (1891–1980), Danish author

Epithet
 Valdemar Sejr (1170–1241), Danish king as Valdemar II of Denmark

Given name
 Sejr Volmer-Sørensen (1914–1982), Danish actor

Surnames of Scandinavian origin